The Community Cadet Forces is a term used by the United Kingdom Ministry of Defence (MOD) to group together the Sea Cadets and Volunteer Cadet Corps, Army Cadet Force and Air Training Corps. Together with the Combined Cadet Force (CCF) they constitute the UK's MOD-sponsored cadet forces. The Volunteer Cadet Corps, which in 2017 became the fifth MOD sponsored cadet force, enjoy close ties with the Royal Marines elements of the Sea Cadet Corps and the Combined Cadet Force forming a tri-partite family of 'Royal Marines Cadets'.

While these cadet forces are sponsored by the MOD and maintain strong ties, traditions and customs with the British Armed Forces, they are Volunteer Youth Organisations and have no liability for military service. The MOD describe the Cadet Forces as offering "challenging and enjoyable activities for young people, and prepare them to play an active part in the community while developing valuable life skills."

As of 1 April 2019, there were 110,620 Cadets and Cadet Force Adult Volunteers in the Community Cadet Forces.

Cadet Ranks 

Army cadets ranks share associated regiment's equivalent rank title.

See also
Cadet#UK
Cadet Vocational Qualification Organisation (CVQO)
Reserve Forces and Cadets Association

References

British Cadet organisations